Rogoźno is a town in Greater Poland Voivodeship, west-central Poland.

Rogozno may also refer to the following places:
Rogóźno, Kuyavian-Pomeranian Voivodeship (north-central Poland)
Rogóźno, Łask County in Łódź Voivodeship (central Poland)
Rogóźno, Łowicz County in Łódź Voivodeship (central Poland)
Rogóźno, Zgierz County in Łódź Voivodeship (central Poland)
Rogóźno, Łęczna County in Lublin Voivodeship (east Poland)
Rogóźno, Tomaszów Lubelski County in Lublin Voivodeship (east Poland)
Rogóźno, Masovian Voivodeship (east-central Poland)
Rogóźno, Greater Poland Voivodeship (west-central Poland)
Rogóżno, Subcarpathian Voivodeship (south-east Poland)